Nikki Hayes or Nicky Hayes may be:
Nikki Hayes, Irish DJ
Nikki Hayes (singer), American singer
Nicky Hayes, British psychologist